Robin Hahn (19 July 1933 – 14 August 2021) was a Canadian equestrian. He competed at the 1968 Summer Olympics, the 1972 Summer Olympics and the 1976 Summer Olympics.

References

External links
 

1933 births
2021 deaths
Canadian male equestrians
Olympic equestrians of Canada
Equestrians at the 1968 Summer Olympics
Equestrians at the 1972 Summer Olympics
Equestrians at the 1976 Summer Olympics
Sportspeople from Regina, Saskatchewan